Scott Blackwood is an American novelist, short story writer, and nonfiction writer. He is the author of three books of fiction and two books of narrative nonfiction on the rise of blues and jazz and the story of the Great Migration. His most recent novel, See How Small, won the 2016 PEN USA Award for fiction.

He grew up in Texas and attended the University of Texas before receiving an MFA in creative writing from Texas State University. He currently lives in Austin, Texas, and will start his three-year distinguished professor of creative writing at Hollins University in Roanoke, Virginia, this fall. In the past, he has been the visiting associate professor in the creative writing program at the University of North Texas. He previously taught at Southern Illinois University-Carbondale, Roosevelt University in Chicago, and at the University of Texas at Austin.

Works
Fiction and nonfiction 

The Rise and Fall of Paramount Records Vol 1 (1917-1927) Third Man / Revenant  
The Rise and Fall of Paramount Vol 2 (1928-1932) Third Man / Revenant

Recognition
2004-2005 Dobie-Paisano Prize and Residency 
2007 AWP Prize for the Novel for We Agreed to Meet Just Here
2010 Texas Institute of Letters Award for Best Work of Fiction We Agreed to Meet Just Here 
2010 PEN Center USA Award Finalist for Best Work of Fiction We Agreed to Meet Just Here 
2011 Whiting Award Fiction
2015 Nominated for a Grammy Award for Best Album Notes for The Rise and Fall of Paramount Records, Volume One (120 page narrative of Paramount Story) 
2015 NPR "Great Reads" Best Books of 2015 See How Small  
2015 New York Times' "Editor's Choice" Selection See How Small  
2015 Amazon Editors' January "Spotlight" Pick for best new book for January 2015   
2015 People magazine best new releases of spring 2015   
2016 National Magazine Award Finalist for Feature Writing, "Here We Are," Chicago magazine, November 2015
2016 PEN Center USA Award for Best Work of Fiction See How Small

References

External links

Profile at The Whiting Foundation

Living people
Year of birth missing (living people)
Place of birth missing (living people)
21st-century American novelists
University of Texas at Austin alumni
Texas State University alumni
American male novelists
Southern Illinois University faculty
Novelists from Texas
21st-century American short story writers
21st-century American male writers
Novelists from Illinois